Dusche (German: Shower) is a song by Farin Urlaub. It's the first single and fourteenth (and the last) track from his album Am Ende der Sonne. It's about a paranoid man, who fears things in his house, thinking that they are conspiring to assassinate him. The man fights back and decides to burn everything down, when nothing else helps. The shower is the only one on his side. The man gradually grows more frenetic, until the end, where he is stabbed by his only friend.

Video
Farin plays a hitman, hired to kill or rather destroy the things also mentioned in the song. The video however shows betrayal - the shower kills the protagonist with a blade in the end.

Track listing
 "Dusche" ("Shower") – 4:12
 "Alle Fragen dieser Welt" ("All questions of this world") – 1:51
 "Klasse" ("Classy") – 3:12
 "Dusche" (Video) – 4:12

2005 singles
Songs written by Farin Urlaub
Farin Urlaub songs
2005 songs